Carballeda may refer to:

La Carballeda, comarca in Zamora Province, Spain
Carballeda de Valdeorras, municipality in Ourense Province, Galicia, Spain 
Carballeda de Avia, municipality in Ourense Province, Galicia, Spain